Shimek, Szymek, or Simek are different spellings of a Czech family name. The name is derived from Czech and Croatian Šimek, or Polish Szymek. The name comes from a hypocorism of the name Simon (Szymon in Polish and Czech). Shimek is the Anglicized spelling.

Shimek
 Bohumil Shimek (1861–1937), American naturalist and conservationist
 Liz Moeggenberg née Shimek (1984), American professional basketball player
 Mazarine Shimek, a character from the 2003 novel The Master Butchers Singing Club by Louise Erdrich
 Shimek State Forest,  Iowa, U.S.

Simek
 14098 Šimek, an asteroid
 Artie Simek (1916–1975), an American calligrapher best known as a letterer for Marvel Comics
 Frank Simek (1984), an American association football (soccer) player 
 Juraj Šimek (1987), a Swiss professional ice-hockey player
 Martin Šimek, a Dutch television personality and brother to Miloslav Šimek
 Miloslav Šimek (1940–2004), a Czech comedian
 Miroslav Šimek (1959), a Czech slalom canoer
 Péter Simek (1980), a Hungarian football (soccer) player
 Radim Šimek, Czech ice hockey player
 Rudolf Simek (1954), an Austrian philologian and historian

See also
 Schimek (disambiguation), a Germanized version of the same name